Ramsay Carelse (born 30 October 1985) is a South African high jumper.

He was born in Somerset West, Western Cape. He finished fifth at the 2004 World Junior Championships, fifth at the 2006 Commonwealth Games and won the bronze medal at the 2006 African Championships. He also competed at the 2006 World Indoor Championships without reaching the final.

His personal best is 2.30 metres, achieved in March 2005 in Oudtshoorn.

References

1985 births
Living people
People from Somerset West
South African male high jumpers
Athletes (track and field) at the 2006 Commonwealth Games
Commonwealth Games competitors for South Africa
Sportspeople from the Western Cape